This article is one of a series providing information about endemism among birds in the World's various zoogeographic zones. For an overview of this subject see Endemism in birds.

This article covers eastern North America, i.e. the regions of the United States and Canada which lie east of the Rocky Mountains.

Patterns of endemism
There are no families endemic to this region, although a high proportion of the species in the following families are endemics or near-endemics:

 the New World warblers, Parulidae

Endemic Bird Areas
Most bird species which are endemic to this region have ranges which are too large to qualify for Birdlife International's restricted-range endemic status; consequently, this region has no Endemic Bird Areas defined. However, there are two secondary areas, namely:
 Michigan Jack pine savanna (code s003), the breeding grounds of Kirtland's warbler.
 The Edwards Plateau (code s004), the breeding grounds of golden-cheeked warbler (and also an important area for black-capped vireo).

List of species
The following is a list of species endemic to this region:

 American black duck
 Lesser prairie-chicken
 Greater prairie-chicken
 King rail
 Whooping crane
 American woodcock
 Red-cockaded woodpecker
 Red-headed woodpecker
 Red-bellied woodpecker
 Florida scrub-jay
 Fish crow
 Tufted titmouse
 Carolina chickadee
 Brown-headed nuthatch
 Brown thrasher
 Eastern towhee
 Bachman's sparrow
 Saltmarsh sparrow
 Seaside sparrow
 Boat-tailed grackle

Remaining passerines to be added

In addition, the following are endemic as breeding species: 

 Mississippi kite
 Broad-winged hawk
 Piping plover
 Mountain plover
 Marbled godwit
 Black-billed cuckoo
 Chuck-will's-widow
 Eastern whip-poor-will
 Chimney swift
 Ruby-throated hummingbird
 Eastern wood pewee
 Acadian flycatcher
 Eastern phoebe
 Great crested flycatcher
 White-eyed vireo
 Yellow-throated vireo
 Blue-headed vireo
 Philadelphia vireo
 Bicknell's thrush
 Wood thrush
 Blue-winged warbler
 Golden-winged warbler
 Northern parula
 Chestnut-sided warbler
 Black-throated blue warbler
 Black-throated green warbler
 Golden-cheeked warbler
 Blackburnian warbler
 Cerulean warbler
 Yellow-throated warbler
 Kirtland's warbler
 Prairie warbler
 Black-and-white warbler
 Worm-eating warbler
 Swainson's warbler
 Prothonotary warbler
 Louisiana waterthrush
 Mourning warbler
 Connecticut warbler
 Kentucky warbler
 Canada warbler
 Hooded warbler
 Field sparrow
 Henslow's sparrow
 Scarlet tanager
 Dickcissel
 Rose-breasted grosbeak
 Baltimore oriole
Remaining passerines to be added

The following species are near-endemic:

 Yellow rail
 Eastern screech-owl

List of passerines to be added

Lists of birds of North America
E
North America